The Sahara frog (Pelophylax saharicus) is a species of frog in the family Ranidae. It is native to Egypt, Libya, Tunisia, Algeria, Morocco, Spanish North Africa (Ceuta and Melilla), and Western Sahara; it has also been introduced to Gran Canaria. In French it is called grenouille verte d'Afrique du Nord, and in Spanish it is known as rana verde norteafricana.

Description
It is sometimes confused with Perez's frog (Pelophylax perezi), and the published description may be partially of that species. The head is as wide as it is long, the snout is oval and the eyes have horizontal pupils. Males have a pair of vocal sacs on the throat. A ridge connects the nostrils and upper eyelids and continues to the groin, separating the back from the flanks. The hind feet are webbed. The colour is variable, being reported as green, brown or mixed, sometimes with darker spots. Some frogs have a yellowish or greenish line along the spine. The legs are always spotted or barred.

Distribution and habitat
The Sahara frog is native to North Africa where its range includes Western Sahara, Morocco, Algeria, Tunisia, Libya and Egypt. It has been introduced to the Canary Islands. It is aquatic and found in and near streams, oasis pools, irrigation canals, lakes, and other water bodies.

Status
The Sahara frog is abundant where a suitable wetland habitat is present. Though its population has remained steady, over-exploitation and pollution of water sources could threaten the species in the future. The International Union for Conservation of Nature has assessed its conservation status as being of "least concern".

A population has been discovered in 2021 in the Etang de Berre wetland in Southern France, spreading to several localities, reproducing and present since 2011 at least, and is considered there an invasive species.

References

Pelophylax
Amphibians described in 1913
Amphibians of North Africa
Vertebrates of Egypt
Fauna of Libya
Fauna of Western Sahara
Taxonomy articles created by Polbot